The Nehru Brigade or 4th Guerrilla Regiment was a unit of the  Indian National Army, that formed a part of the First INA and later part of the 1st Division after the INA's revival under Subhas Chandra Bose.Subhas Bose named the regiment after Nehru. 

The unit did not participate in the INA's Imphal campaign, and was later transferred to the command of Lt. Col. Gurubaksh Singh Dhillon in 1944.  It fought against the Commonwealth forces during the Irrawaddy crossing and later in around Popa Hill.

References

Further reading
 Fay, Peter W. (1993), The Forgotten Army: India's Armed Struggle for Independence, 1942-1945. Ann Arbor, University of Michigan Press., 

South-East Asian theatre of World War II
Military units and formations of the Indian National Army
Monuments and memorials to Jawaharlal Nehru